Armstrong Creek may refer to:

In the United States
Armstrong Creek (Pennsylvania), a tributary of the Susquehanna River in Pennsylvania
Armstrong Creek (West Virginia), a stream
Armstrong Creek, Wisconsin, a town in Forest County, Wisconsin
Armstrong Creek (community), Wisconsin, an unincorporated community in the above town
In Australia
Armstrong Creek, Queensland, a locality within the Moreton Bay region
Armstrong Creek, Victoria, a suburb of the Geelong region
Armstrong Creek Growth Area, a growth area of the Geelong region